ISO 3166-2:EG is the entry for Egypt in ISO 3166-2, part of the ISO 3166 standard published by the International Organization for Standardization (ISO), which defines codes for the names of the principal subdivisions (e.g., provinces or states) of all countries coded in ISO 3166-1.

Currently for Egypt, ISO 3166-2 codes are defined for 27 governorates. 6th of October Governorate and Helwan Governorate, which had their codes added in Newsletter II-2, were merged back into Giza Governorate and Cairo Governorate respectively in 2011.

Each code consists of two parts, separated by a hyphen. The second part is either one, two, or three letters.

Current codes
Subdivision names are listed as in the ISO 3166-2 standard published by the ISO 3166 Maintenance Agency (ISO 3166/MA).

Click on the button in the header to sort each column.

 Notes

Changes
The following changes to the entry have been announced by the ISO 3166/MA since the first publication of ISO 3166-2 in 1998:

See also
 Subdivisions of Egypt
 FIPS region codes of Egypt

References

External links
 ISO Online Browsing Platform: EG
 Governorates of Egypt, Statoids.com

2:EG
ISO 3166-2
Egypt geography-related lists